Obernbreit is a municipality  in the district of Kitzingen in Bavaria in Germany.

References

Kitzingen (district)